Elegy is a maxi-single/EP by symphonic metal band Leaves' Eyes, released on 2 May 2005. Almost all vocals are by the Norwegian singer Liv Kristine, with some backing "growls" by her husband Alexander Krull. The song "Elegy" is taken from the then upcoming album Vinland Saga, and a further track from that album, "Solemn Sea" is also included in demo form. The rest of the tracks are exclusive to this release, but unlike the following EP Legend Land, they do not share the Vinland theme.

Track listing

Personnel

Leaves' Eyes
 Liv Kristine Espenæs Krull – female vocals
 Alexander Krull – keyboards, programming, death growls
 Thorsten Bauer – guitars
 Mathias Röderer – guitars
 Chris Lukhaup – bass
 Moritz Neuner – drums, percussion

Production
Produced, engineered, mixed and mastered by Alexander Krull at Mastersound Studios
Assistant recording engineers: Mathias Röderer, Thorsten Bauer, Chris Lukhaup, Robert Suß

Charts

References

2005 EPs
Leaves' Eyes albums
Napalm Records EPs
Albums produced by Alexander Krull
Cultural depictions of Leif Erikson